Özen is a Turkish name, it may refer to:

 Ali Özen (born 1971), Turkish wrestler
 Eren Özen, Turkish footballer
 Gökhan Özen (born 1979), Turkish singer and songwriter
 Mahmut Özen (born 1988), Turkish footballer
 Önder Özen, footballer, coach, football club director
 Oğuz Can Özen, Turkish artist, member of the band The Away Days 
 Sinan Özen (born 1964), Turkish singer, musician, songwriter, composer, actor and TV presenter
 Tülin Özen (born 1979), Turkish actress
 Önder Özen (born 1969), Turkish footballer

See also
 Özen Dam, dam in Turkey
 Ozen (disambiguation)

Turkish-language surnames
Turkish masculine given names